Nabil Fahmi (born 5 January 1951) is an Egyptian diplomat and politician who served in the government of Egypt as minister of foreign affairs from June 2013 to July 2014.

Early life and education
Nabil Fahmi was born in New York on 5 January 1951. His father, Ismail Fahmi, was Anwar Sadat's foreign minister from 1973 to 1977.

He holds a bachelor of science degree in physics and mathematics and a master's degree in management, both of which he received from the American University in Cairo in 1974 and 1976, respectively.

Career
Fahmi is a career diplomat. He served in the Egyptian cabinet from 1974 to 1978 in various posts, including deputy foreign minister. He also assumed the post of advisor to the Vice President of Egypt and was the secretary of the president for external communications from February 1974 to August 1976. He worked at the Ministry of Foreign Affairs in different capacities, including member of the Egyptian mission to the United Nations Office at Geneva and New York and political advisor from August 1993 to September 1997. He served as the Ambassador of Egypt to Japan from September 1997 to September 1999. Next he served as the Ambassador of Egypt to the United States from October 1999 to September 2008. Therefore, his term saw the September 11 attacks.

From 1999 to 2003 he was also among the members of the UN Secretary General's advisory board on disarmament issues and he was appointed chairman of the board in 2001. Upon returning to Cairo he was named Ambassador-at-Large at the ministry.

After leaving his diplomatic post, he entered politics. He was a member of the Constitution Party headed by Mohamed ElBaradei. He also joined The American University in Cairo as a faculty member. He is also the founding dean of university's school of public affairs. In addition, he worked as the dean at the faculty. He was named non-resident chair of the Middle East project carried out by the James Martin center for nonproliferation studies in 2009. He was also a board member of McLarty associates.

On 14 July 2013, he announced that he accepted a proposal to become minister of foreign affairs in the interim government of Egypt led by Hazem Al Beblawi. He accepted the post after Mohamed Kamel Amr had declared his intention not to continue in the post. On 16 July Fahmi's term as foreign minister began. Fahmi suspended his membership at the Constitution Party when he began to serve as foreign minister.

Personal life
Fahmi is married and has three children. He publishes various articles in his blog at The Huffington Post. He is the author of Egypt’s Diplomacy in War, Peace and Transition which was published by Palgrave Macmillan in 2020.

He was given an honorary PhD by the Monterey Institute of International Studies, Middlebury College, in May 2009.

References

External links

20th-century Egyptian diplomats
21st-century Egyptian politicians
1951 births
Ambassadors of Egypt to the United States
Ambassadors of Egypt to Japan
The American University in Cairo alumni
Academic staff of The American University in Cairo
Beblawi Cabinet
Collegiate School (New York) alumni
Foreign ministers of Egypt
Living people
HuffPost bloggers
21st-century Egyptian writers
21st-century Egyptian diplomats
20th-century Egyptian politicians